The fifth season of the sitcom Full House originally aired between September 17, 1991 and May 12, 1992 on ABC.

Plot
In season five, Jesse and Rebecca become parents when Becky gives birth to twin boys, Nicky and Alex. Meanwhile, Jesse & The Rippers launch a new song which eventually becomes successful. Joey gets his own show The Legend of Ranger Joe which becomes a success. D. J. starts high school, and gets her own room while Stephanie and Michelle share a room. Stephanie starts fourth grade and Michelle starts kindergarten. Danny finds love.

Main cast 

 John Stamos as Jesse Katsopolis
 Bob Saget as Danny Tanner 
 Dave Coulier as Joey Gladstone
 Candace Cameron as D. J. Tanner
 Jodie Sweetin as Stephanie Tanner
 Mary-Kate and Ashley Olsen as Michelle Tanner
 Lori Loughlin as Rebecca "Becky" Donaldson
 Andrea Barber as Kimmy Gibbler

Episodes

See also 
 List of Full House episodes

References 

General references 
 
 

1991 American television seasons
1992 American television seasons
5